This is a list of Air India Football Club's managers and their records, from 2009, when the first full-time manager was appointed, to the present day.

History
Ever sense the beginning Air India never really had a permanent professional manager. Most of their managers were just youth development coaches. It wasn't till 2010 when Air India signed their first a-licensed professional manager in Santosh Kashyap.

Statistics
Information correct as of 30 December 2012. Only competitive matches are counted. Wins, losses and draws are results at the final whistle; the results of penalty shoot-outs are not counted.

References

Air India
Air India FC managers